Lisieux is an unincorporated community in the Rural Municipality of Willow Bunch No. 42, Saskatchewan, Canada. It was designated as an organized hamlet prior to 2018.

History 
The place was originally named Joeville, after Joseph-Hermenegilde Préfontaine, an early homesteader. It was given its present name in 1926 to honour the recently canonized Saint Thérèse of Lisieux. There was a post office at Lisieux from 1921 to 1991. Lisieux relinquished its organized hamlet designation on December 31, 2017.

Demographics 

See also 
List of communities in Saskatchewan

References 

Designated places in Saskatchewan
Unincorporated communities in Saskatchewan
Willow Bunch No. 42, Saskatchewan
Division No. 3, Saskatchewan